Second Best Bed is a 1938 British comedy film directed by Tom Walls and starring Walls, Jane Baxter and Veronica Rose. The screenplay is by Ben Travers,  based on an earlier story of his.  Walls and Travers had worked together on the Aldwych farces.  The screenplay concerns a newly married couple who soon run into domestic difficulties when the wife refuses to obey her husband's every order.

It was an independent production made at Shepperton Studios. The film's sets were designed by the art director Walter Murton.

Main cast
 Tom Walls as Victor Garnett
 Jane Baxter as Patricia Lynton
 Veronica Rose as Jenny Murdoch
 Carl Jaffe as Georges Dubonnet
 Greta Gynt as Yvonne
 Edward Lexy as Murdoch
 Tyrell Davis as Whittaker
 Mae Bacon as Mrs Whittaker
 Ethel Coleridge as Mrs Knuckle
 Davy Burnaby as Lord Kingston
 Martita Hunt as Mrs Mather
 Gordon James as Judge

References

External links

1938 films
1938 comedy films
Films directed by Tom Walls
British comedy films
Films based on The Taming of the Shrew
Films set in England
Films set in London
Films set in Monaco
Films shot at Shepperton Studios
British black-and-white films
1930s English-language films
1930s British films